Wing Commander Krishan Kant Saini, AVSM, VrC, VM (born 26 Oct 1931), was an Indian Air Force helicopter pilot of 104 Squadron who set the world record in helicopter avionics by accomplishing the world's highest altitude helicopter landing. He attained this feat on 8 May 1969 when he landed a Cheetah helicopter at the altitude of 6858 m (22,500 feet) in the Karkoram ranges.

Saini was also a distinguished officer of Indian Air Force, who was decorated for both gallantry and meritorious service. He won the prestigious Vir Chakra, the third highest award for gallantry in Indian Armed Forces, in 1962 Sino-Indian war when he carried out a dare-devil evacuation mission on his helicopter amidst hostile fire from many directions by the Chinese troops. Despite being hit by bullet and being temporarily blinded, he carried out his mission, winning himself a Vir Chakra in the process. Wing Commander Saini also subsequently received Vayusena Medal for Gallantry and Ati Vishist Seva Medal for meritorius service.

Later he was appointed Managing Director of Pawan Hans, where he brought to the attention of the Government issues with the quality of helicopters.

Gallantry award citation 

Wing Commander Saini's gallantry award citation reads as follows:

"Flight Lieutenant Krishan Kant Saini had been operating in NEFA area since October, 1960. On 18th November, 1962, he, along with his co-pilot was evacuating seriously injured battle casualties in Walong area. He was instructed to land at a helipad close to the enemy line which was reported to be clear of enemy troops. When he was over the helipad, Chinese troops opened fire from many directions. His helicopter was hit at several places; the main reducter was damaged and oil from it gushed out in a thick spray which blinded him temporarily. His right ankle was also injured by a splinter and he was bleeding profusely. With great determination, presence of mind and skill, he dived the helicopter almost to ground level to avoid further damage from enemy fire. He thus saved the helicopter and the lives of his co-pilot and passengers. In spite of the damaged hydraulic system and the personal injury, he skilfully brought the aircraft back to base. 

Flight Lieutenant Saini displayed courage, determination and professional skill of a high order."

References

Indian Air Force officers
Recipients of the Vir Chakra
Helicopter pilots
1931 births
Living people
Recipients of the Ati Vishisht Seva Medal
Recipients of the Vayu Sena Medal
Indian aviation record holders
Rotorcraft flight record holders